The 32nd Vanier Cup was played on November 30, 1996, at the SkyDome in Toronto, Ontario, and decided the CIAU football champion for the 1996 season. The Saskatchewan Huskies won their second championship by defeating the St. Francis Xavier X-Men by a score of 31–12.

References

External links
 Official website

Vanier Cup
Vanier Cup
1996 in Toronto
November 1996 sports events in Canada